Vikram is a 1986 Telugu-language romantic action film directed by V. Madhusudhana Rao, produced by Akkineni Venkat under the Annapurna Studios banner. Nagarjuna, Shobana  and music was composed by Chakravarthy. The film was a remake of the Hindi film Hero  (1983) and it is the debut of Nagarjuna as a hero.

Plot
The film starts off with Sardar being taken to prison. To get out of the situation, he writes to his best man, Vikram. Vikram goes to Ananda Rao and warns him. He then kidnaps Ananda Rao's daughter Radha. He tells her that he is a police officer and they fall in love; however, she finds out that he is a goon. Nevertheless, she does not leave him but urges him to surrender. Transformed by true love, Vikram surrenders himself to the police and is imprisoned for two years. Back home, Radha tells her brother Rambabu the whole truth. To keep Radha from marrying someone else, he calls his friend Tommy to put on a show that Radha and Tommy love each other. Tommy misunderstands the situations and actually falls in love with Radha. When Vikram comes back, he starts working in a garage and tries to reform himself. Despite everything, Ananda Rao kicks him out of his life. After many days and events that follow, Rambabu finds out that Tommy is a smuggler. After getting released from prison, Sardar desires revenge against both Ananda Rao and Vikram, so he kidnaps Radha, Ananda Rao and Rambabu. Vikram comes at the last moment and frees all of them. As a happy ending, Ananda Rao lets Radha marry Vikram.

Cast

Nagarjuna as Vikram / Vicky Dada / Murali
Shobana as Radha
Satyanarayana as Ananda Rao
Kannada Prabhakar as Sardar 
Chandra Mohan as Rambabu 
Sudhakar as Tommy 
Kanta Rao as Goppaiah
Manik Irani as Goon
Ahuti Prasad 
Surya
Annapurna as Yashoda
Rama Prabha as Sundari
Rajya Lakshmi as Seeta 
Pushpalatha as Anasuya
Anuradha as item number 
Master Suresh as Young Vikram

Soundtrack

The music was composed by Chakravarthy. Lyrics written by Veturi. Music released on KONERU Audio Company.

References

External links
 

1986 films
1980s Telugu-language films
Films directed by V. Madhusudhana Rao
Films scored by K. Chakravarthy
Telugu remakes of Hindi films
Indian action films
1986 action films